Sit Back with Jack is a Canadian music variety television series which aired on CBC Television in 1960.

Premise
This Winnipeg-produced series featured Jack Shapira and his band. Each episode featured a "Shapira Sound Track" segment of location footage filmed in Winnipeg on subjects such as the Canadian Pacific Railway freight yards or scenes of Friday evening shopping. Guests during the series run not only included professional musicians such as Bud & Travis, Frank D'Rone and Ray Eberle, but amateur performers such as Father Clayton Barclay (a harpsichord player), Wally Keep (a singing taxi driver), Vince Lovallo (a singing blacksmith) and Bobby Swartz (ventriloquist, operating his dummy Elmer).

Scheduling
This half-hour series was broadcast Sundays at 1:00 p.m. from 17 April to 26 June 1960.

References

External links
 

CBC Television original programming
1960 Canadian television series debuts
1960 Canadian television series endings